War and War is a 1999 novel by the Hungarian writer László Krasznahorkai. It tells the story of a Hungarian man who is obsessed with a mysterious manuscript, which he decides to travel to New York City to write down and post on the Internet. An English translation by George Szirtes was published in 2006.

Reception
The New Yorker's James Wood wrote in 2011: "this is one of the most profoundly unsettling experiences I have had as a reader. By the end of the novel, I felt that I had got as close as literature could possibly take me to the inhabiting of another person, and, in partble fictions, its own grotesquely fertile pain ('Heaven is sad')."

References

External links
 War and War at the Hungarian publisher's website 
 War and War at the American publisher's website

1999 novels
Hungarian novels
Works by László Krasznahorkai
Magvető books